Anil Singh may refer to:
 Anil Singh (javelin thrower) (born 1985), Indian track and field athlete
 Anil Singh (politician) (born 1967), Indian politician from Bihar
 Anil C. Singh, Indian lawyer and politician
 Anil Kumar Singh (chemist), Indian chemist
 Anil Singh, chairman of Bhagwant University in Ajmer, Rajasthan, India